Loyola may refer to:

People
 St. Ignatius of Loyola
 Loyola (surname)
 Etsowish-simmegee-itshin, indigenous man whose baptismal name was Loyola

Places

 Loyola (CTA), a station on the Chicago Transit Authority's 'L' system, in Chicago, Illinois, US
 Loyola (Montreal), a district of Côte-des-Neiges–Notre-Dame-de-Grâce, Montreal, Quebec, Canada
 Loyola, California, an unincorporated town in Santa Clara County, California, US
 Loyola, San Sebastián, a neighborhood in San Sebastián, Guipúzcoa, Spain
 Sanctuary of Loyola, Azpeitia, Guipúzcoa, Spain

Education

Secondary schools

Asia & Oceania

India 
 Loyola High School (Goa), Margao
 Loyola High School, Patna, Bihar
 Loyola High School (Pune), Maharashtra
 Loyola High School, Hindupur
 Loyola High School, Karimnagar
 Loyola High School, KD Peta
 Loyola High School, Vinukonda
 Loyola Higher Secondary School, Kuppayanallur
 Loyola Public School, Nallapadu, Andhra Pradesh
 Loyola School, Baripada, Odisha
 Loyola School, Bhubaneswar, Odisha
 Loyola School, Chennai, Chennai
 Loyola School, Jamshedpur, Jharkhand
 Loyola School, Thiruvananthapuram, Kerala

Australia 
 Loyola College, Melbourne, secondary school in Watsonia, a suburb of Melbourne, Victoria
 Loyola College, Mount Druitt, secondary school in New South Wales

Indonesia 
 Kolese Loyola, Semarang, Central Java

New Zealand
 St Ignatius of Loyola Catholic College, Drury (opening 2023)

Africa

Kenya 
 St. Ignatius Mukumu Boys, high school in Kakamega, Kenya

Nigeria 
 Loyola Jesuit College, secondary school in Abuja, Nigeria
 Loyola College, Ibadan, Nigeria

Tanzania 
 Loyola School, Dar es Salaam, Tanzania

North America

Canada 
 Loyola Catholic Secondary School, Mississauga, Ontario
 Loyola High School (Montreal), Quebec
 St. Ignatius of Loyola Secondary School (Oakville), Ontario

United States 
 Loyola Academy, Wilmette, Illinois
 Loyola Blakefield, Towson, Maryland
 Loyola Catholic School, Mankato, Minnesota
 Loyola College Prep, Shreveport, Louisiana
 Loyola High School (Detroit), Michigan
 Loyola High School (Los Angeles), California
 Loyola Sacred Heart High School, Missoula, Montana
 Loyola School (New York City), Manhattan, New York
 Saint Ignatius High School (Cleveland), Cleveland, Ohio
 St. Ignatius College Preparatory, San Francisco, California
 St. Ignatius College Preparatory School, Chicago, Illinois

South America
 Colegio San Ignacio de Loyola (Caracas), La Castellana, Caracas, Venezuela
 Colegio San Ignacio de Loyola (Medellín), Medellín, Antioquia, Colombia
 Colegio San Ignacio de Loyola (San Juan), San Juan, Puerto Rico
 Loyola College, Belo Horizonte, MG, Brazil
 Colegio Loyola Gumilla, Ciudad Guayana, Bolívar, Venezuela

Universities and colleges

Canada
 The former Loyola College (Montreal), Quebec (now Concordia University)
 Loyola International College, part of Concordia University
 Loyola Student Residence & Loyola Academic Complex, part of Saint Mary's University (Halifax), Nova Scotia

India
 Andhra Loyola College, Vijayawada, Andhra Pradesh
 Loyola Academy, Secunderabad, Andhra Pradesh
 Loyola College, Chennai, Tamil Nadu

Peru
 Universidad San Ignacio de Loyola (St. Ignatius of Loyola University) (USIL), Lima, Peru
 San Ignacio University, the university's international campus in Miami.
 Instituto San Ignacio de Loyola (ISIL), the university's institute for short careers, Lima, Peru

United States
 Loyola Marymount University, Los Angeles, California
 Loyola Law School
 Loyola Marymount Lions, this school's intercollegiate athletic program
 Loyola University Chicago, Illinois
 Loyola University Chicago School of Law
 Loyola University Medical Center
 Loyola Ramblers, the school's intercollegiate athletic program
 Loyola University Maryland, Baltimore, Maryland (formerly, Loyola College)
 Loyola Greyhounds, the school's intercollegiate athletic program
 Loyola University New Orleans, Louisiana
 Loyola University New Orleans College of Law
 St. Ignatius College, renamed John Carroll University, Cleveland, Ohio

Elsewhere
 Instituto Politécnico Loyola (Loyola Polytechnic Institute), Benemérita de San Cristóbal, Dominican Republic
 Loyola College of Culion, Palawan, Philippines
 Loyola University Andalusia, Seville and Cordoba, Spain

Science
 3589 Loyola, a main-belt asteroid

Spirituality
 Loyola Hall, Rainhill, Merseyside, United Kingdom
 Loyola House, Guelph, Ontario, Canada
 Villa Loyola, Sudbury, Ontario, Canada

See also
 
 St. Ignatius High School (disambiguation)
 Saint Ignatius College (disambiguation)